It May Be You is a 1915 American silent comedy film featuring Oliver Hardy.

Cast
 Arthur Housman - Jack Kenwood
 Andy Clark - The Office Boy (as Andrew J. Clark)
 Dallas Welford - Hi Jinks
 Mabel Dwight - Mrs. Jinks
 Maxine Brown - Jinks's Stenographer
 Charles Ascot - William Hall (as Charles Ascott)
 Caroline Rankin - Stenographer
 Oliver Hardy - Paul Simmons (as O.N. Hardy)
 Jessie Stevens - Stenographer
 Harry Eytinge - A Banker
 Gladys Leslie - His secretary
 Julian Reed - James Redfield
 Jean Dumar - Lillian

See also
 List of American films of 1915
 Oliver Hardy filmography

External links

1915 films
1915 short films
American silent short films
American black-and-white films
1915 comedy films
Silent American comedy films
American comedy short films
1910s American films
1910s English-language films